A histone fold is a structurally conserved motif found near the C-terminus in every core histone sequence in a histone octamer responsible for the binding of histones into heterodimers.

The histone fold averages about 70 amino acids and consists of three alpha helices connected by two short, unstructured loops. When not in the presence of DNA, the core histones assemble into head-to-tail intermediates (H3 and H4 first assemble into heterodimers then fuse two heterodimers to form a tetramer, while H2A and  H2B form heterodimers) via extensive hydrophobic interactions between each histone fold domain in a "handshake motif". Also the histone fold was first found in TATA box-binding protein-associated factors, which is a main component in transcription.

The histone fold’s evolution can be found by different combinations of ancestral sets of peptides that make up helix-strand-helix motif that come from the three folds from the ancestral fragments. These peptide chains can be found in the archaeal histones, which could have come from eukaryotic H3-H4 tetramer. The archaeal single-chain histones are also found in the bacterium Aquifex aeolicus. Which helps the diverse bacteria phylogeny coming from the ancestry of eukaryotes and archaea with lateral gene transfers to get to the bacteria. These lead into the octamer articulated protein endoskeleton for DNA compaction. From this endoskeleton it has a central segment that folds for the histone dimerization. This then leads into the end segments of the fold to make properties of dimer-dimer contacts that also cap the protein super helix at the octamer. 

One species that looked at is Drosophila, and in the subunits of the Drosophila transcription initiation factor has specific amino acid sequences that have different characteristics of the histone folds that make up the two proteins make up the subunits. When just looking at the histone fold motif in the Drosophila the protein-protein and the protein DNA interaction of the core histone proteins can be found by looking at the non-histone proteins. This can then be used in “Structural studies on the TAFII42/TAFII62 complex from Drosophila and HMfB from Methanococcus fervidus, proteins identified as containing the histone fold in the aforementioned searches, confirmed that a histone-like substructure exists in these proteins, with the individual proteins folding into the canonical histone fold motif”. The evolutionary structure and range of the histone protein-protein and DNA-protein interactions of the histone fold proteins has a very wide range of evolutionary traits that form the structures and other proteins.

Histone folds play a role in the nucleosomal core particle by conserving histone interactions  when looking at interface surfaces. These contain more than one histone fold. The structure of the nucleosome core particle has two modes that have the largest interaction surfaces with are in groups H3-H4 and H2A-H2B heterotypic dimer interactions. When looking at the H2A-H2A structure it has a modification of the loop at the interface that excludes it from clustering with the same interface of other structures. Which makes it have a different function in the transcriptional activation. Also the two modes are distinct due to having the longest helix chains. These use the handshake interactions between the two histone folds, while they also use it to make themselves unique comparted to the rest of the modes. Similarly modes 5 and 7 of the core nucleosome particle use two types of histone fold dimers which show that all histone domains share a similar structural motif to be able to be able to interact with one another and to interact in different ways. Showing how flexible and adaptive the structure of histones are.

H4 and H2A can form an internucleosomal contacts that can be acetylated to be able to perform ionic interactions between two peptides, which in turn could change the surrounding internucleosomal contacts that can make a way to opening the chromatin.

References

Protein folding
Molecular biology